Anostomus brevior is a fish in the family Anostomidae.

Description
Max length : 12.0 cm SL male/unsexed.

Distribution
South America:  Oyapock River basin in French Guiana.

References

Anostomidae
Taxa named by Jacques Géry
Fish described in 1961